A Master of Information Management (MIM) is an interdisciplinary degree program designed to provide studies in strategic information management, knowledge management, usability, business administration, information systems, information architecture, information design, computer sciences, policy, ethics, and project management. The degree is relatively new and has typically been developed alongside other, more established programs in university Schools of Information. The MIM degree has emerged to address the growing and unique need for information professionals who understand the conflux of multiple organizational issues across several disciplines.

The MIM degree is distinguished from closely related degrees (for example, Master of Science in Information System Management, Master of Information System Management, Master of Information Systems) that provide focused areas of study in computer science, information technology, information science, telecommunications, or some combination of these.

History 

The first MIM Program in New Zealand was started in 2002 at Victoria University of Wellington.
The first MIM degree program in the United States began in the fall of 2003 at The University of Maryland. Canada's first MIM program was established in Spring 2008.

MIM Programs

United States 
 Arizona State University
 Missouri Western State University
 Syracuse University School of Information Studies
 UIUC Graduate School of Library and Information Science
 University of Maryland College of Information Studies: Master of Information Management
 University of Michigan School of Information
 University of Washington Information School
 Washington University School of Engineering

Canada 

 Dalhousie University

Colombia 

Escuela colombiana de ingeniería Julio Garavito

New Zealand 

 Victoria University of Wellington

Australia 
 RMIT University

United Kingdom 
 The Information School at The University of Sheffield
 London School of Economics and Political Science

Belgium 

 Katholieke Universiteit Leuven

Czech Republic 

 Brno University of Technology

The Netherlands 

 Tilburg University
 Maastricht University

Denmark 

 Copenhagen Business School

India 

University of Mumbai
 Jamnalal Bajaj Institute of Management Studies, Mumbai
 MET (Mumbai Educational Trust) Institute of Management Studies, Bandra, Mumbai
 Welingkar Institute of Management Studies, Mumbai
 K.J. Somaiya Institute of Management Studies, Mumbai
 IES Institute of Management Studies, Mumbai
 Thakur Institute of Management Studies and Research, Mumbai
 Aditya Institute of Management Studies And Research, Mumbai

Philippines 
 University of the East
 Colegio de San Juan de Letran-Calamba (Master in Management-Information Technology Management)

Poland 

 Jagiellonian University (Master in Information Management)

Portugal 

 NOVA University Lisbon (NOVA IMS - NOVA Information Management School)

Spain 

Universidad de Murcia

Iceland 
 Reykjavík University

Taiwan 

National Dong Hwa University School of Management
National Taiwan University of Science and Technology

Curriculum 

The University of Maryland College of Information Studies describes the MIM degree as a focus "on ways information and technology can be best organized, implemented and managed to meet the needs of end users in a variety of business, legal, nonprofit, government and institutional settings, which are affected by changes in the global environment every day."

Curriculum will vary from school to school.

At the University of Maryland, MIM students can specialize, earning a degree with a concentration of Strategic Management of Information Concentration or Technology Development and Deployment (formerly Socio-Tech Information Systems). The Strategic Management of Information is intended for those students who want to become organizations’ chief information officers, or follow that general management path. Technology Development and Deployment is designed for students who want to follow technology director career paths.

See also 

 List of I-Schools
 Applied Information Management

References

External links 
 Syracuse University, School of Information Studies, Master of Science in Information Management 
 University of Maryland, College of Information Studies, Master of Information Management Program
 Washington University in St. Louis, College of Engineering, Graduate Studies in Information Management
 Dalhousie University, Faculty of Management, Master of Information Management
 Victoria University of Wellington, School of Information Management, MIM | School of Information Management
 Katholieke Universiteit Leuven, Faculty of Business and Economics, Master of Information Management
 Tilburg University, TiasNimbas Business School, Executive Master of Information Management
 Missouri Western State University, Masters in Information Management
 University of Washington Information School, Masters in Information Management

Master's degrees